{{DISPLAYTITLE:C22H29FO5}}
The molecular formula C22H29FO5 (molar mass: 392.46 g/mol, exact mass: 392.1999 u) may refer to:

 Betamethasone
 Dexamethasone
 Fluperolone
 Paramethasone

Molecular formulas